"Easier Said Than Done" is a popular song sung by The Essex that was a number-one song in the United States during 1963. It topped the Billboard Hot 100 singles chart on July 6, 1963, and remained there for two weeks. The song was written by William Linton and Larry Huff.

The Essex were active-duty members of the United States Marine Corps at the time, as was Linton, who wrote the song at the request of Essex member Walter Vickers. Linton said the song's rhythm was inspired by the sound of the Teletype machines in the communications office at Camp Lejeune. The group was not thrilled with the composition, but recorded it for use as the B-side of their debut single, "Are You Going My Way". The recording was unusually short, and editing was used to repeat part of the recording; even so, the song was only a little over two minutes. The single was released in May 1963, but "Easier Said Than Done" quickly emerged as the more popular side. It became a major hit with broad appeal, reaching #1 on both the pop and rhythm and blues charts. The song became the title track of the group's first album, which reached #113 on the Billboard album chart, becoming their only charting album.

Chart history

Weekly charts

Year-end charts

References

1963 singles
Billboard Hot 100 number-one singles
Cashbox number-one singles
Number-one singles in New Zealand
Roulette Records singles
1963 songs